My Childish Father may refer to:

 My Childish Father (1930 film), French film
 My Childish Father (1953 film), French film